Hong Kong Mathematical High Achievers Selection Contest (HKMHASC, Traditional Chinese: 香港青少年數學精英選拔賽) is a yearly mathematics competition for students of or below Secondary 3 in Hong Kong. It is jointly organized by Po Leung Kuk and Hong Kong Association of Science and Mathematics Education since the academic year 1998-1999. Recently, there are more than 250 secondary schools participating.

Format and Scoring
Each participating school may send at most 5 students into the contest. There is one paper, divided into Part A and Part B, with two hours given. Part A is usually made up of 14 - 18 easier questions, carrying one mark each. In Part A, only answers are required. Part B is usually made up of 2 - 4 problems with different difficulties, and may carry different number of marks, varying from 4 to 8. In Part B, workings are required and marked.  No calculators or calculation assisting equipments (e.g. printed mathematical tables) are allowed.

Awards and Further Training
Awards are given according to the total mark. The top 40 contestants are given the First Honour Award (一等獎), the next 80 the Second Honour Award (二等獎), and the Third Honour Award (三等獎) for the next 120. Moreover, the top 4 can obtain an award, namely the Champion and the 1st, 2nd and 3rd Runner-up. 

Group Awards are given to schools, according to the sum of marks of the 3 contestants with highest mark. The first 4 are given the honour of Champion and 1st, 2nd and 3rd Runner-up. The honour of Top 10 (首十名最佳成績) is given to the 5th-10th, and Group Merit Award (團體優異獎) is given to the next 10.

First Honour Award achievers would receive further training. Eight students with best performance will be chosen to participate in the Invitational World Youth Mathematics Inter-City Competition (IWYMIC).

List of Past Champions (1999-2019)
98-99: Queen Elizabeth School, Ying Wa College
99-00: Queen's College
00-01: La Salle College
01-02: St. Paul's College
02-03: Queen's College
03-04: La Salle College
04-05: La Salle College
05-06: La Salle College
06-07: La Salle College
07-08: La Salle College
08-09: Diocesan Boys' School
09-10: St. Paul's Co-educational College
10-11: La Salle College
11-12: La Salle College
12-13: Queen Elizabeth School
13-14: Po Leung Kuk Centenary Li Shiu Chung Memorial College
14-15: Queen's College
15-16: Pui Ching Middle School
16-17: La Salle College
17-18: Queen's College
18-19: La Salle College
22-23: Diocesan Boys' School

Performance by school

See also
List of mathematics competitions
Hong Kong Mathematics Olympiad
Invitational World Youth Mathematics Inter-City Competition
Education in Hong Kong
Po Leung Kuk
Hong Kong Association of Science and Mathematics Education

External links
Official website (in Traditional Chinese)

Competitions in Hong Kong
Mathematics competitions